Pakistan Hunting and Sporting Arms Development Company (Urdu: پاکستان شکار اور کھیلوں آرمز ڈویلپمنٹ کمپنی) (PHSADC) was established by Ministry of Industries & Production as a subsidiary of Pakistan Industrial Development Corporation. The company was established in 2008 under Companies Ordinance 1984.
PHSADC is mandated to promote hunting and sporting products in Pakistan and in the international market.

Exports 
The company got numerous orders for export from USA and European nations.

See also 
 Defence industry of Pakistan

References

External links
 

Government-owned companies of Pakistan
Manufacturing companies established in 2008
Pakistani companies established in 2008
Firearm manufacturers of Pakistan